Philip John Blakeway (born 31 December 1950) is a former  international rugby union player. He toured South Africa in 1980 with the British and Irish Lions and at the time played club rugby for Gloucester Rugby.

Notes

1950 births
Living people
English rugby union players
British & Irish Lions rugby union players from England
Rugby union props
England international rugby union players
Gloucestershire County RFU players
Rugby union players from Cheltenham